Human-centered design (HCD, also human-centred design, as used in ISO standards) is an approach to problem-solving commonly used in  process, product, service and system design, management, and engineering frameworks that develops solutions to problems by involving the human perspective in all steps of the problem-solving process. Human involvement typically takes place in initially observing the problem within context, brainstorming, conceptualizing, developing of concepts and implementing the solution.
 
Human-centered design is an approach to interactive systems development that aims to make systems usable and useful by focusing on the users, their needs and requirements, and by applying human factors/ergonomics, and usability knowledge and techniques. This approach enhances effectiveness and efficiency, improves human well-being, user satisfaction, accessibility and sustainability; and counteracts possible adverse effects of use on human health, safety and performance. ISO 9241-210:2019(E)
 
Human-centered design builds upon participatory action research by moving beyond participants'  involvement and producing solutions to problems rather than solely documenting them. Initial stages usually revolve around immersion, observing, and contextual framing in which- innovators immerse themselves in the problem and community. Subsequent stages may then focus on community brainstorming, modeling and prototyping and implementation in community spaces.

Development
Human-centered design has its origins at the intersection of numerous fields including engineering, psychology, anthropology and the arts. As an approach to creative problem-solving in technical and business fields its origins are often traced to the founding of the Stanford University design program in 1958 by Professor John E. Arnold who first proposed the idea that engineering design should be human-centered. This work coincided with the rise of creativity techniques and the subsequent design methods movement in the 1960s. Since then, as creative design processes and methods have been increasingly popularized for business purposes, human-centered design is increasingly referred to simply as "design thinking".

In Architect or Bee?,  Mike Cooley coined the term "human-centered systems" in the context of the transition in his profession from traditional drafting at a drawing board to computer-aided design. Human-centered systems, as used in economics, computing and design, aim to preserve or enhance human skills, in both manual and office work, in environments in which technology tends to undermine the skills that people use in their work.

See in particular; Human-centered systems by Mike Cooley; Chapter 10; Designing Human-centered Technology: A Cross-disciplinary Project in Computer-aided Manufacturing; Springer-Verlag London 1989; Editor: Howard Rosenbrock; 

In the 2008 paper "On Human-Machine Symbiosis" Cooley asserts "Human centeredness asserts firstly, that we must always put people before machines, however complex or elegant that machine might be, and, secondly, it marvels and delights at the ability and ingenuity of human beings. The Human Centered Systems movement looks sensitively at these forms of science and technology which meet our cultural, historical and societal requirements, and seeks to develop more appropriate forms of technology to meet our long-term aspirations. In the Human Centered System, there exists a symbiotic relation between the human and the machine, in which the human being would handle the qualitative subjective judgements and the machine the quantitative elements. It involves a radical redesign of the interface technologies and at a philosophical level, the objective is to provide tools (in the Heidegger sense) which would support human skill and ingenuity rather than machines which would objectivise that knowledge".

User participation 

The user-oriented framework relies heavily on user participation and user feedback in the planning process. Users are able to provide new perspective and ideas, which can be considered in a new round of improvements and changes. It is said that increased user participation in the design process can garner a more comprehensive understanding of the design issues, due to more contextual and emotional transparency between researcher and participant. A key element of human centered design is applied ethnography, which is a research method adopted from cultural anthropology. This research method requires researchers to be fully immersed in the observation so that implicit details are also recorded.

Rationale for adoption 

Even after decades of thought on "Human Centered Design", management and finance systems still believe that 'another's liability is one's asset' could be true of porous human bodies, embedded in nature and inseparable from each other. On the contrary, our biological and ecological interconnections ensure that 'another's liability is our liability'. Sustainable business systems can only emerge if these biological and ecological interconnections are accepted and accounted for.

Using a human-centered approach to design and development has substantial economic and social benefits for users, employers and suppliers. Highly usable systems and products tend to be more successful both
technically and commercially. In some areas, such as consumer products, purchasers will pay a premium for well-designed products and systems. Support and help-desk costs are reduced when users can understand
and use products without additional assistance. In most countries, employers and suppliers have legal obligations to protect users from risks to their health, and safety and human-centered methods can reduce these risks (e.g. musculoskeletal risks). Systems designed using human-centered methods improve quality, for example, by:

 increasing the productivity of users and the operational efficiency of organizations
 being easier to understand and use, thus reducing training and support costs
 increasing usability for people with a wider range of capabilities and thus increasing accessibility
 improving user experience
 reducing discomfort and stress
 providing a competitive advantage, for example by improving brand image
 contributing towards sustainability objectives

Human-centered design may be utilized in multiple fields, including sociological sciences and technology. It has been noted for its ability to consider human dignity, access, and ability roles when developing solutions. Because of this, human-centered design may more fully incorporate culturally sound, human-informed, and appropriate solutions to problems in a variety of fields rather than solely product and technology-based fields. Because human-centered design focuses on the human experience, researchers and designers can address "issues of social justice and inclusion and encourage ethical, reflexive design."

Human-centered design arises from underlying principles of human factors. When it comes to those two concepts, they are quite interconnected; human factors is about discovering the attributes of human cognition and behavior that are important for making technology work for people. It is what allows us as a species to innovate over time. For example we used human-centered design to discover that blackberries have less human usability than an iPhone and that important controls on a panel that look too similar will be easily confused and may cause an increased risk of human error.

Which brings up an important distinction between human-centered design and any other form of design. It's not just about aesthetics, and it's not always designing for interfaces. It could be designing for controls in the world, tasks in the world, hardware, decision-making, and cognition. For instance, if a nurse is too tired from a long shift, he might confuse the pumps through which he might administer a bag of penicillin to a patient. So you can see in this case, the human-centered design case would encompass a task redesign, a possible institute policy redesign, and an equipment redesign.

Typically, human-centered design is more focused on  "methodologies and techniques for interacting with people in such a manner as to facilitate the detection of meanings, desires and needs, either by verbal or non-verbal means." In contrast, user-centered design is another approach and framework of processes which considers the human role in product use, but focuses largely on the production of interactive technology designed around the user's physical attributes rather than social problem-solving.

Critiques

Human-centered design has been both lauded and criticised for its ability to actively solve problems with affected communities. Criticisms include the inability of human-centered design to push the boundaries of available technology by solely tailoring to the demands of present-day solutions, rather than focus on possible future solutions. In addition, human-centered design often considers context, but does not offer tailored approaches for very specific groups of people. New research on innovative approaches include youth-centered health design, which focuses on youth as the central aspect with particular needs and limitations not always addressed by human-centered design approaches. Nevertheless, human-centered design that doesn't reflect very specific groups of users and their needs is human-centered design poorly executed, since the principles of human-system interaction require the reflection of those specified needs.

Whilst users are very important for some types of innovation (namely incremental innovation), focusing too much on the user may result in producing an outdated or no longer necessary product or service. This is because the insights that you achieve from studying the user today are insights that are related to the users of today and the environment she or he lives in today. If your solution will be available only two or three years from now, your user may have developed new preferences, wants and needs by then.

International Standard 
 ISO 13407:1999 Human-centred design processes for interactive systems - Now Withdrawn
 ISO 9241-210:2010 Ergonomics of human-system interaction -- Part 210: Human-centred design for interactive systems - Now Withdrawn
 ISO 9241-210:2019 Ergonomics of human-system interaction -- Part 210: Human-centred design for interactive systems - UPDATED 2019

See also
 User-centered design
 Design thinking
 Human-Centered Artificial Intelligence

References

Design
Humanism